The 1958 Western Michigan Broncos baseball team represented Western Michigan University in the 1958 NCAA University Division baseball season. The Broncos played their home games at Hyames Field. The team was coached by Charlie Maher in his 20th year at Western Michigan.

The Broncos won the District IV playoff to advanced to the College World Series, where they were defeated by the Missouri Tigers.

Roster

Schedule 

! style="" | Regular Season
|- 

|- align="center" bgcolor="#ffcccc"
| 1 || April 4 || at  || Sembower Field • Bloomington, Indiana || 1–4 || 0–1 || –
|- align="center" bgcolor="#ccffcc"
| 2 || April 4 || at Indiana || Sembower Field • Bloomington, Indiana || 6–3 || 1–1 || –
|- align="center" bgcolor="#ccffcc"
| 3 || April 5 || at Indiana || Sembower Field • Bloomington, Indiana || 12–3 || 2–1 || –
|- align="center" bgcolor="#ffcccc"
| 4 || April 5 || at Indiana || Sembower Field • Bloomington, Indiana || 5–7 || 2–2 || –
|- align="center" bgcolor="#ccffcc"
| 5 || April 8 || at Indiana || Sembower Field • Bloomington, Indiana || 19–2 || 3–2 || –
|- align="center" bgcolor="#ccffcc"
| 6 || April 8 || at Indiana || Sembower Field • Bloomington, Indiana || 11–4 || 4–2 || –
|- align="center" bgcolor="#ffcccc"
| 7 || April 15 || at  || Ray Fisher Stadium • Ann Arbor, Michigan || 2–7 || 4–3 || –
|- align="center" bgcolor="#ccffcc"
| 8 || April 18 ||  || Hyames Field • Kalamazoo, Michigan || 7–4 || 5–3 || 1–0
|- align="center" bgcolor="#ccffcc"
| 9 || April 19 || Marshall || Hyames Field • Kalamazoo, Michigan || 6–3 || 6–3 || 2–0
|- align="center" bgcolor="#fffdd0"
| 10 || April 21 || at  || Unknown • Iowa City, Iowa || 7–7 || 6–3–1 || 2–0
|- align="center" bgcolor="#ccffcc"
| 11 || April 25 ||  || Hyames Field • Kalamazoo, Michigan || 3–2 || 7–3–1 || 3–0
|- align="center" bgcolor="#ccffcc"
| 12 || April 26 || Bowling Green || Hyames Field • Kalamazoo, Michigan || 3–1 || 8–3–1 || 4–0
|- align="center" bgcolor="#ccffcc"
| 13 || April 30 ||  || Hyames Field • Kalamazoo, Michigan || 7–5 || 9–3–1 || 4–0
|-

|- align="center" bgcolor="#ccffcc"
| 14 || May 2 ||  || Hyames Field • Kalamazoo, Michigan || 8–1 || 10–3–1 || 5–0
|- align="center" bgcolor="#ccffcc"
| 15 || May 3 || Toledo || Hyames Field • Kalamazoo, Michigan || 6–0 || 11–3–1 || 6–0
|- align="center" bgcolor="#ccffcc"
| 16 || May 9 || at  || Unknown • Oxford, Ohio || 7–0 || 12–3–1 || 7–0
|- align="center" bgcolor="#ccffcc"
| 17 || May 10 || at Miami (OH) || Unknown • Oxford, Ohio || 6–3 || 13–3–1 || 8–0
|- align="center" bgcolor="#ffcccc"
| 18 || May 13 || Michigan || Hyames Field • Kalamazoo, Michigan || 6–8 || 13–4–1 || 8–0
|- align="center" bgcolor="#ccffcc"
| 19 || May 16 || at  || Unknown • Kent, Ohio || 5–2 || 14–4–1 || 9–0
|- align="center" bgcolor="#ccffcc"
| 20 || May 17 || at Kent State || Unknown • Kent, Ohio || 6–2 || 15–4–1 || 10–0
|- align="center" bgcolor="#ffcccc"
| 21 || May 19 ||  || Hyames Field • Kalamazoo, Michigan || 3–7 || 15–5–1 || 10–0
|- align="center" bgcolor="#ffcccc"
| 22 || May 20 || Wisconsin || Hyames Field • Kalamazoo, Michigan || 2–23 || 15–6–1 || 10–0
|- align="center" bgcolor="#ccffcc"
| 23 || May 23 ||  || Hyames Field • Kalamazoo, Michigan || 2–1 || 16–6–1 || 10–0
|-

|-
! style="" | Postseason
|-

|- align="center" bgcolor="#ccffcc"
| 24 || May 28 ||  || Hyames Field • Kalamazoo, Michigan || 4–0 || 17–6–1 || 10–0
|- align="center" bgcolor="#ccffcc"
| 25 || May 29 ||  || Hyames Field • Kalamazoo, Michigan || 24–2 || 18–6–1 || 10–0
|- align="center" bgcolor="#ccffcc"
| 26 || May 30 || Notre Dame || Hyames Field • Kalamazoo, Michigan || 5–4 || 19–6–1 || 10–0
|-

|- align="center" bgcolor="#ccffcc"
| 27 || May 31 || Notre Dame || Hyames Field • Kalamazoo, Michigan || 5–2 || 20–6–1 || 10–0
|- align="center" bgcolor="#ccffcc"
| 28 || June 7 || at Michigan State || Old College Field • East Lansing, Michigan || 5–4 || 21–6–1 || 10–0
|-

|- align="center" bgcolor="#ffcccc"
| 29 || June 13 || vs Missouri || Omaha Municipal Stadium • Omaha, Nebraska || 1–3 || 21–7–1 || 10–0
|- align="center" bgcolor="#ccffcc"
| 30 || June 15 || vs Lafayette || Omaha Municipal Stadium • Omaha, Nebraska || 4–3 || 22–7–1 || 10–0
|- align="center" bgcolor="#ccffcc"
| 31 || June 16 || vs Clemson || Omaha Municipal Stadium • Omaha, Nebraska || 5–3 || 23–7–1 || 10–0
|- align="center" bgcolor="#ffcccc"
| 32 || June 17 || vs Missouri || Omaha Municipal Stadium • Omaha, Nebraska || 1–3 || 23–8–1 || 10–0
|-

Awards and honors 
Bob Mason
 First Team All-MAC

Dick Sosnowski
 First Team All-MAC

Marv Winegar
 First Team All-MAC

References 

Western Michigan Broncos baseball seasons
Western Michigan Broncos baseball
College World Series seasons
Western Michigan
Mid-American Conference baseball champion seasons